The Manti National Guard Armory, at 50 E. 100 North in Manti, Utah was built in 1936-38 as a Works Progress Administration project.  It was listed on the National Register of Historic Places in 1986.

It is a two-story PWA Moderne-style, flat-roofed building.

It was designed by Salt Lake City architect Niels P. Larsen, who also designed at least six other armories in Utah.  Surviving, as of 1986, were the NRHP-listed Mount Pleasant National Guard Armory and ones in Nephi, Fillmore,  and Spanish Fork (the latter was NRHP-listed in 1986, but was delisted in 1996, presumably after being demolished); ones in Logan and Cedar City had been demolished.

References

Armories on the National Register of Historic Places
Armories in Utah
National Register of Historic Places in Sanpete County, Utah
PWA Moderne architecture in Utah
Buildings and structures completed in 1938